Tazir Yunusovich Kariyev (12 February 1989 – 8 July 2018) was a Russian professional football player.

Club career
He made his Russian Football National League debut for FC Angusht Nazran on 9 March 2014 in a game against FC Arsenal Tula. That was his only season in the FNL.

Death
Kariyev was murdered by a gunshot early on 8 July 2018.

References

External links
 

1989 births
2018 deaths
People murdered in Russia
Russian footballers
FC Angusht Nazran players
FC Rostov players
Male murder victims
Russian murder victims
Deaths by firearm in Russia
Association football midfielders
Association football forwards
People from Kropotkin, Krasnodar Krai
Sportspeople from Krasnodar Krai